Oregon Township is a township in Washington County, Iowa, USA.

History
Oregon Township was established in 1847. It was named by an early settler who was considering moving to Oregon.

References

Townships in Washington County, Iowa
Townships in Iowa
1847 establishments in Iowa